Arcanjo  may refer to:

Estádio José Arcanjo, a multi-use stadium in Olhão, Portugal
São Miguel Arcanjo, São Paulo, a municipality in the state of São Paulo, Brazil
Junio César Arcanjo (1983-), a Brazilian football attacking midfielder
São Miguel Arcanjo (disambiguation)
São Miguel Arcanjo (São Miguel)